For other people named Shaukat Aziz, see Shaukat Aziz (disambiguation).

Shaukat Aziz Siddiqui (born 1 July 1959) is a Pakistani jurist and former senior Justice of the Islamabad High Court.

Early life and education
He was born on 1 July 1959 in Rawalpindi, Pakistan. He completed his early education from Gordon College, Rawalpindi. He then went to the University of the Punjab for LLB and MBA.

Judicial career
He started his career as an advocate of district courts in 1988. He was elevated to the advocate of High Court in 1990 and advocate of Supreme Court of Pakistan in 2001. He won the election in 2011 and became President of High Court Bar Association, Rawalpindi. On 21 November 2011, he was elevated as Justice of Islamabad High Court.

Removal 
In 2018, he accused Inter-Services Intelligence (ISI) for designing a coup against the government of Nawaz Sharif.  Later, in October, he was removed as Justice of the Islamabad High Court by the recommendations of Supreme Judicial Council of Pakistan to the President of Pakistan.

References

Living people
1959 births
Government Gordon College alumni
University of the Punjab alumni
People from Rawalpindi
Judges of the Islamabad High Court
Pakistani lawyers
Inter-Services Intelligence operations